Minutargyrotoza calvicaput is a species of moth of the family Tortricidae. It is found in Japan.

The wingspan is about 13.5 mm.

The larvae have been recorded feeding on Ligustrum tschonoskii.

References

Moths described in 1900
Archipini